Shamil Gentovich Abdurakhimov (born September 2, 1981) is a Russian mixed martial artist, who is currently fighting in the heavyweight division. He formerly competed for the Ultimate Fighting Championship (UFC).

Background
Abdurakhimov was born on September 2, 1981 in Kuyada village, Gunibsky District, Dagestan in the family of Avar descent. He started training in Sanshou, Boxing and Freestyle wrestling in primary school. After his military service he became a Sanshou national champion in Russia.

Mixed martial arts career

Abu Dhabi Fighting Championship
On May 14, 2010 at ADFC: Battle of the Champions, he fought Jeff Monson and won via majority decision.

Abdurakhimov fought Sokoudjou on October 22, 2010 at ADFC: Round 2. He won via TKO (punches) in the third round.

In his last fight with the ADFC, Abdurakhimov faced Marcos Oliveira at ADFC: Round 3. He won via TKO (punches) in the first round. The win also earned him the ADFC heavyweight belt and one million dirham ($272,000).

Ultimate Fighting Championship

On January 15, 2015 he signed a contract with the UFC.

In his debut, Abdurakhimov faced Timothy Johnson on April 4, 2015 at UFC Fight Night 63 He lost the fight via TKO in the first round.

Abdurakhimov faced Anthony Hamilton on February 21, 2016 at UFC Fight Night 83. He won the fight by unanimous decision.

Abdurakhimov next faced Walt Harris on October 1, 2016 at UFC Fight Night 96. He won the fight via split decision.

Abdurakhimov faced Derrick Lewis on December 9, 2016 in the main event at UFC Fight Night 102. After winning the first three rounds, he lost the fight by TKO in the fourth round.

Abdurakhimov faced Chase Sherman on 25 November 2017 at UFC Fight Night 122. He won the fight via knockout in the first round.

Abdurakhimov faced Andrei Arlovski on September 15, 2018 at UFC Fight Night 136. He won the fight by unanimous decision.

Abdurakhimov faced Marcin Tybura on April 20, 2019 at UFC Fight Night 149. He won the fight via TKO in the second round.

Abdurakhimov faced Curtis Blaydes on September 7, 2019 at UFC 242. He lost the fight via TKO in the second round.

Abdurakhimov was scheduled to face Ciryl Gane on April 18, 2020 at UFC 249. However, on March 5, 2020 it was announced that Gane was forced to pull out from the event due to struck by pneumothorax during one of his trainings. The bout was eventually rescheduled for July 11, 2020 at UFC 251.  Subsequently, the pairing was cancelled a second time and scrapped from this event in mid-June as Abdurakhimov was removed from the bout for undisclosed reasons. The pair was rescheduled on September 26, 2020 at UFC 253. However, the bout was rescheduled again to UFC Fight Night 180 on October 18, 2020. The bout fell through once again as Abdurakhimov pulled out due to undisclosed reasons on September 28, 2020 and he was replaced by promotional newcomer Ante Delija.

Abdurakhimov was scheduled to face Augusto Sakai on May 1, 2021 at UFC on ESPN 23. However, Abdurakhimov was removed from the bout in mid-April due to alleged visa issues that restricted his travel.

Abdurakhimov was scheduled to face Chris Daukaus at UFC on ESPN: Sandhagen vs. Dillashaw, but the matchup was removed from that card on July 19 due to COVID-19 protocols within Abdurakhimov's camp. The pair remained intact and was scheduled at UFC on ESPN: Hall vs. Strickland on 
July 31, 2021. However, the bout was postponed for unknown reasons to UFC 266. Abdurakhimov lost the fight via technical knockout in round two.

Abdurakhimov was scheduled to face Tom Aspinall on March 19, 2022  at  UFC Fight Night 204. However, Aspinall was pulled from the bout and he was replaced by Sergei Pavlovich. He lost the fight via technical knockout in round one.

Abdurakhimov was scheduled to face Jailton Almeida on September 10, 2022 at UFC 279. However, Abdurakhimov was forced to withdraw due to visa issues. The pair was rescheduled for UFC 280 on October 22, 2022. With that date also falling through, the pair was re-booked for a third time at UFC 283. He lost the fight via technical knockout in the second round.

After the loss, it was announced that Abdurakhimov was no longer on the UFC roster.

Championships and accomplishments

Mixed Martial Arts
Abu Dhabi Fighting Championship
ADFC World Heavyweight Champion

Sanshou
Russian Sanshou Federation
Five Time Russian National Champion

Mixed martial arts record

|-
|Loss
|align=center|20–8
|Jailton Almeida
|TKO (punches)
|UFC 283
|
|align=center|2
|align=center|2:56
|Rio de Janeiro, Brazil
|
|-
|Loss
|align=center|20–7
|Sergei Pavlovich
|TKO (punches)
|UFC Fight Night: Volkov vs. Aspinall
|
|align=center|1
|align=center|4:03
|London, England
|
|-
|Loss
|align=center|20–6
|Chris Daukaus
|TKO (punches and elbows)
|UFC 266 
|
|align=center|2
|align=center|1:23
|Las Vegas, Nevada, United States
|
|-
|Loss
|align=center|20–5
|Curtis Blaydes
|TKO (elbow and punch)
|UFC 242 
|
|align=center|2
|align=center|2:22
|Abu Dhabi, United Arab Emirates
|
|-
|Win
|align=center|20–4
|Marcin Tybura
|TKO (punches)
|UFC Fight Night: Overeem vs. Oleinik 
|
|align=center|2
|align=center|3:15
|Saint Petersburg, Russia
|
|-
|Win
|align=center|19–4
|Andrei Arlovski
|Decision (unanimous)
|UFC Fight Night: Hunt vs. Oleinik 
|
|align=center|3
|align=center|5:00
|Moscow, Russia
|
|-
|Win
|align=center|18–4
|Chase Sherman
|KO (punches)
|UFC Fight Night: Bisping vs. Gastelum
|
|align=center|1
|align=center|1:24
|Shanghai, China
|
|-
|Loss
|align=center|17–4
|Derrick Lewis
|TKO (punches)
|UFC Fight Night: Lewis vs. Abdurakhimov
|
|align=center|4
|align=center|3:42
|Albany, New York, United States
|
|-
|Win
|align=center|17–3 
|Walt Harris
| Decision (split)
|UFC Fight Night: Lineker vs. Dodson
|
|align=center| 3
|align=center| 5:00
|Portland, Oregon, United States
|  
|-
|Win
|align=center|16–3
|Anthony Hamilton
|Decision (unanimous)
|UFC Fight Night: Cowboy vs. Cowboy
|
|align=center|3
|align=center|5:00
|Pittsburgh, Pennsylvania, United States
|
|-
|Loss
|align=center| 15–3
|Timothy Johnson
|TKO (punches)
|UFC Fight Night: Mendes vs. Lamas
|
|align=center| 1
|align=center| 4:57
|Fairfax, Virginia, United States
|
|-
|Win
|align=center| 15–2
|Kenny Garner
|Decision (unanimous)
|M-1 Challenge 49
|
|align=center| 3
|align=center| 5:00
|Ingushetia, Russia
|
|-
|Win
|align=center| 14–2
|Neil Grove
|Decision (unanimous)
|Tech-Krep Fighting Championship: Southern Front 2
|
|align=center| 3
|align=center| 5:00
|Krasnodar, Russia
|
|-
|Win
|align=center| 13–2
|Jerry Otto
|Submission (keylock)
|ProFC 40
|
|align=center| 1
|align=center| 1:46
|Volgograd, Russia
| 
|-
|Loss
|align=center| 12–2
|Tony Lopez
|Submission (triangle choke)
|WUFC: Challenge of Champions
|
|align=center| 3
|align=center| 1:54
|Makhachkala, Russia
| 
|-
|Win
|align=center| 12–1
|Marcos Oliveira
|TKO (punches)
|ADFC: Round 3
|
|align=center| 3
|align=center| 2:17
|Abu Dhabi, United Arab Emirates
|
|-
|Win
|align=center| 11–1
|Sokoudjou
|TKO (punches)
|ADFC: Round 2
|
|align=center| 3
|align=center| 2:17
|Abu Dhabi, United Arab Emirates
|
|-
|Win
|align=center| 10–1
|Jeff Monson
|Decision (majority)
|ADFC: Battle of the Champions
|
|align=center| 3
|align=center| 5:00
|Abu Dhabi, United Arab Emirates
|
|-
|Win
|align=center| 9–1
|Shamil Abdulmuslimov
|TKO (punches)
|ProFC: Commonwealth Cup
|
|align=center| 1
|align=center| 1:41
|Moscow, Russia
|
|-
|Win
|align=center| 8–1
|Mikhail Rutskiv
|Submission (armbar)
|ProFC: Pride & Honour
|
|align=center| 1
|align=center| 1:39
|Rostov-on-Don, Russia
|
|-
|Win
|align=center| 7–1
|Baga Agaev
|Decision (unanimous)
|ProFC: Union Nation Cup 4
|
|align=center| 2
|align=center| 5:00
|Rostov-on-Don, Russia
|
|-
|Loss
|align=center| 6–1
|Thiago Santos
|Decision (unanimous)
|Union of Veterans of Sport: Mayor's Cup 2009
|
|align=center| 3
|align=center| 5:00
|Novosibirsk, Russia
|
|-
|Win
|align=center| 6–0
|Roman Savochka
|TKO (corner stoppage)
|ProFC: Union Nation Cup 2
|
|align=center| 2
|align=center| 1:47
|Rostov-on-Don, Russia
|
|-
|Win
|align=center| 5–0
|Roman Mirzoyan
|Submission (armbar)
|ProFC: Union Nation Cup 1
|
|align=center| 1
|align=center| 3:30
|Rostov-on-Don, Russia
|
|-
|Win
|align=center| 4–0
|Vitalii Yalovenko
|KO (punches)
|ProFC: King of The Night 2
|
|align=center| 1
|align=center| 1:39
|Rostov-on-Don, Russia
|
|-
|Win
|align=center| 3–0
|Ante Maljkovic
|TKO (punches)
|ProFC: Russia vs. Europe
|
|align=center| 1
|align=center| 1:17
|Rostov-on-Don, Russia
|
|-
|Win
|align=center| 2–0
|Gabriel Garcia
|TKO (punches)
|FightFORCE: Day of Anger
|
|align=center| 1
|align=center| 0:57
|Saint Petersburg, Russia
|
|-
|Win
|align=center| 1–0
|Vladimir Kuchenko
|Submission (kimura)
|FightFORCE: Russia vs. The World
|
|align=center| 1
|align=center| N/A
|Saint Petersburg, Russia
|

References

External links
 
 

1981 births
Avar people
Dagestani mixed martial artists
Living people
Sportspeople from Makhachkala
Russian expatriates in the United States
Russian male mixed martial artists
Heavyweight mixed martial artists
Russian sanshou practitioners
Ultimate Fighting Championship male fighters
Mixed martial artists utilizing sanshou
Mixed martial artists utilizing freestyle wrestling
Mixed martial artists utilizing kickboxing